Humphrey Gilbert (1539–1583) was an English adventurer, colonialist and MP at the court of Elizabeth I.

Humphrey Gilbert may also refer to:
Humphrey Gilbert (cricketer) (1886–1960), Indian-born English cricketer
CCGS Sir Humphrey Gilbert, Canadian Coast Guard icebreaker, renamed Polar Prince

See also
MV Humphrey Gilbert